Afsporet (English: Derailed) is a 1942 Danish erotic thriller drama film directed by Bodil Ipsen and Lau Lauritzen Jr. Starring Ebbe Rode and Illona Wieselmann, the psychological drama revolves around the intense erotic relationship between a wealthy married woman suffering from amnesia and a paroled petty thief entangled with organized crime. Afsporet was Ipsen's directorial debut and is considered the first true Danish film noir.

Cast

References

External links 

Afsporet at Den Danske Film Database (in Danish)
Afsporet at Det Danske Filmistitut (in Danish)

1942 films
Danish crime thriller films
1940s Danish-language films
Film noir
Films directed by Bodil Ipsen
Films directed by Lau Lauritzen Jr.
Films scored by Sven Gyldmark
1940s crime thriller films
Danish erotic drama films
Danish black-and-white films
1942 directorial debut films